Pseudocaecilius citricola is a species of false lizard barklouse in the family Pseudocaeciliidae. It is found in Africa, the Caribbean, Central America, North America, Oceania, South America, and Southern Asia.

References

Pseudocaeciliidae
Articles created by Qbugbot
Insects described in 1879